See the Glossary of underwater diving terminology for definitions of technical terms, jargon, diver slang and acronyms used in underwater diving
 See the Outline of underwater diving for a hierararchical listing of underwater diving related articles
 See the Outline of underwater divers for a hierararchical listing of biographical articles on underwater divers
 See the Index of underwater diving for an alphabetical listing of underwater diving related articles
 See the Index of recreational dive sites for an alphabetical listing of underwater dive site related articles

The following index is provided as an overview of and topical guide to underwater divers:

Underwater divers are people who take part in underwater diving activities – Underwater diving is practiced as part of an occupation, or for recreation, where the practitioner submerges below the surface of the water or other liquid for a period which may range between seconds to in the order of a day at a time, either exposed to the ambient pressure or isolated by a pressure resistant suit, to interact with the underwater environment for pleasure, competitive sport, or as a means to reach a work site for profit or in the pursuit of knowledge, and may use no equipment at all, or a wide range of equipment which may include breathing apparatus, environmental protective clothing, aids to vision, communication, propulsion, maneuverability, buoyancy and safety equipment, and tools for the task at hand. 

This index provides links to Wikipedia articles about people who are notable for some aspect of their underwater diving activity.

A

B 
 
 Roger Baldwin (diver) represented by Waage Drill II diving accident – A fatal saturation diving accident in the North Sea in 1975

C

D

E

F

G

H

I

J

K

L 
 
 
 
 
 
 
 
 
 Edwin Clayton Link represented by

M

N

O

P 
 
 
 
 
 
 
 
 
 
 
 Gerard Anthony Prangley represented by

R 
  
 
 
 
 
 
 
 Chris and Chrissy Rouse, represented by

S 
 

  
 
 
 
 
 
 
 
 
 
 
 
 
 
 Pier Skipness represented by 
 
 Robert John Smyth represented by 
 
 
 
 
 
 
 
 
 
 
 
 
 
 
 Albert D. Stover represented by

T

U

V

W 
 
 
 Richard A. Walker represented by Wildrake diving accident – Fatal offshore diving accident in Scotland, 1979
 
 Lothar Michael Ward represented by Star Canopus diving accident – Fatal offshore diving bell accident in 1978
 
 Ebenezer Watson – Nephew of Charles Spalding and died in the same accident

Y

Z

See also 

 Glossary of underwater diving terminology

Underwater diving
Underwater diving